is a Japanese former professional footballer who played as a defender. He played for the Japan national team.

Club career
Ichikawa is a product of Shimizu S-Pulses youth system. He played as right side-back and right midfielder. He made his J1 League debut on March 21, 1998, against Consadole Sapporo. He scored his first league goal against on November 14, 1998, against JEF United Ichihara. He was still a high school student at that time. He was instrumental in Shimizu winning the second stage of 1999 J1 League, the 1999–2000 Asian Cup Winners' Cup and the 2001 Emperor's Cup. The side attack from Ichikawa on the right and Alessandro Santos on the left was Shimizu's main weapon during the period. He left the club end of 2010 season. Toward end of his career, he played for Ventforet Kofu (2011), Mito HollyHock (2012), Fujieda MYFC (2013–14), FC Imabari (2015) and Vanraure Hachinohe (2016). He retired end of 2016 season.

International career
Ichikawa represented Japan national team at several underage levels. He made his first full international debut on April 1, 1998, against South Korea when he was 17 year and 322 days old, which made him the youngest player who represented Japan. Ichikawa was short-listed for the 1998 FIFA World Cup, but national coach Takeshi Okada dropped him together with Kazuyoshi Miura and Tsuyoshi Kitazawa at the final training camp in Nyon, Switzerland.

In March 2002, he was elected Japan for the first time in four years by Philippe Troussier. He was also chosen for the 2002 FIFA World Cup finals and played three games. Against Tunisia in the group stage, his cross was met by Hidetoshi Nakata who headed home to score Japan's second goal. He was capped ten times without scoring between 1998 and 2002.

Career statistics

Club

International

References

External links
 
 
 Japan National Football Team Database
 

1980 births
Living people
Association football people from Shizuoka Prefecture
Japanese footballers
Japan international footballers
J1 League players
J2 League players
J3 League players
Japan Football League players
Shimizu S-Pulse players
Ventforet Kofu players
Mito HollyHock players
Fujieda MYFC players
Vanraure Hachinohe players
Footballers at the 1998 Asian Games
2002 FIFA World Cup players
Association football defenders
Asian Games competitors for Japan